Thestias or variant, may refer to:

 Ixias, an alternate name for this butterfly genus 
 Thestias (planet), an IAU-approved name for Pollux b
 Thestius (Θέστιος), a name originating from Greek Mythology, whose patronymic form is "Thestias"

See also

 Scaptesyle thestias (S. thestias), a moth species
 Potamanaxas thestia (P. thestia), a butterfly species
 Compsodrillia thestia (C. thestia), a sea snail species
 Anmenopsyche thestis (A. thestis), a moth species